Us and Them may refer to:
The sociological concept of in-group and out-group
Us & Them, an American television series
 Us and Them (Australian TV series), a 1994 Australian comedy television series
"Us and Them" (song), by Pink Floyd
Us + Them Tour, a concert tour by Roger Waters
Us and Them (Shinedown album), 2005
Us and Them (Godflesh album), 1999
Us and Them: Symphonic Pink Floyd, a Pink Floyd tribute album
Us and Them, a one-act play by David Campton
Us and Them (film), a 2018 Chinese drama film

See also 

 Us vs. them (website)